Hämeenmaa may refer to:

 Finnish gunboat Hämeenmaa, 1917–1953
 Finnish frigate Hämeenmaa, 1964–1985, later a minelayer
 Hämeenmaa-class minelayer, a two vessel strong class of coastal minelayers

See also
 Tavastia (disambiguation)
 Häme